William D. Murray (September 9, 1908 – March 29, 1986) was an American football and basketball coach and college athletics administrator. He served as the head football coach at University of Delaware from 1940 to 1942 and from 1946 to 1950 and at Duke University from 1951 to 1965, compiling a career college football record of 142–67–11. During his tenure at Delaware, Murray tallied a 49–16–2 mark including three undefeated seasons from 1941, 1942, and 1946; there was no formal team from 1943 to 1945 due to World War II. Murray's career record at Duke was 93–51–9, giving him second most wins in program history behind Wallace Wade. Murray was also the head basketball coach at Delaware for one season in 1944–45.

In 1965, Murray retired as Duke's head football coach was named executive secretary of the American Football Coaches Association (AFCA), where he served for 17 years. He was inducted into the College Football Hall of Fame as a coach in 1974. In 1983, Murray was inducted into the Delaware Sports Museum and Hall of Fame. Murray died on March 29, 1986, in Durham, North Carolina.

Head coaching record

Football

References

External links
 

1908 births
1986 deaths
American football halfbacks
Basketball coaches from North Carolina
College Football Hall of Fame inductees
Delaware Fightin' Blue Hens athletic directors
Delaware Fightin' Blue Hens football coaches
Delaware Fightin' Blue Hens men's basketball coaches
Duke Blue Devils football coaches
Duke Blue Devils football players
Sportspeople from Rocky Mount, North Carolina